Banksia platycarpa is a species of small shrub that is endemic to the south-west of Western Australia. It has broadly linear pinnatipartite leaves, with up to twenty-five sharply pointed lobes on each side, creamy-yellow to orange flowers in heads of up to seventy-five, and egg-shaped follicles.

Description

Taxonomy and naming
This species was first formally described in 1996 by Alex George who gave it the name Dryandra platycarpa and published the description in the journal Nuytsia from specimens he collected in the Alexander Morrison National Park in 1986. The specific epithet (platycarpa) is from Greek words meaning "wide" and "fruit", referring to the follicles.

In 2007, Austin Mast and Kevin Thiele transferred all the dryandras to the genus Banksia and this species became Banksia platycarpa.

Distribution and habitat
Banksia platycarpa grows in kwongan between Eneabba and Mogumber.

Conservation status
This Banksia is classified as "not threatened" by the Western Australian Government Department of Parks and Wildlife.

References

platycarpa
Plants described in 1996
Taxa named by Alex George